Masatoshi Hazama (born: 6 January 1963) is a sailor from Wakayama, Japan. who represented his country at the 1996 Summer Olympics in Savannah, United States as crew member in the Soling. With helmsman Kazunori Komatsu and fellow crew member Kazuyuki Hyodo they took the 19th place.

References

Living people
1963 births
Sailors at the 1996 Summer Olympics – Soling
Olympic sailors of Japan
Japanese male sailors (sport)